Atharva Taide (born 26 April 2000) is an Indian cricketer. He made his List A debut for Vidarbha in the 2018–19 Vijay Hazare Trophy on 20 September 2018. In December 2018, he was named in India's team for the 2018 ACC Emerging Teams Asia Cup. He made his first-class debut for Vidarbha in the 2018–19 Ranji Trophy on 22 December 2018. He made his Twenty20 debut for Vidarbha in the 2018–19 Syed Mushtaq Ali Trophy on 21 February 2019. In February 2022, he was bought by the Punjab Kings in the auction for the 2022 Indian Premier League tournament.

References

External links
 

2000 births
Living people
Indian cricketers
Vidarbha cricketers
Place of birth missing (living people)